Format Films was an animation studio which was founded by Herbert Klynn in 1959 with Jules Engel as vice president, Bob McIntosh and Joseph Mugnaini, all of whom were animators. It was most active during the 1960s, producing episodes of The Alvin Show and Popeye the Sailor. Klynn shut his studio in 1962 but reopened it by 1965 as Format Productions when Engels left for Europe. The studio made eleven sub-contracted shorts in Warner Bros.' theatrical Road Runner series as well as three Daffy Duck and Speedy Gonzales shorts, and produced The Lone Ranger animated series for CBS in 1966.

Format Productions also created title sequences for several TV series, including I Spy, Honey West, the animated characters on the television variety show Hee Haw, animated various TV commercials, and created film title designs for The Glory Guys and Clambake.

TV series
Popeye the Sailor (King Features Syndicate, Jack Kinney Productions/1960)
The Alvin Show (Bagdasarian Film Corporation/1961–1962)
The Lone Ranger (Jack Wrather Corporation, Lone Ranger Productions/1966–1969) (as Format Productions)

TV Pilot 
 The Shrimp (1961)

Theatrical shorts
Tale of Old Wiff (1960)
Icarus Montgolfier Wright (1962) (Academy Award for Best Animated Short Film nominee)
Looney Tunes and Merrie Melodies (Warner Bros., DePatie–Freleng Enterprises/1965–1967) (as Format Productions) 
Run, Run, Sweet Road Runner (1965) (subcontracted)
Tired and Feathered (1965) (subcontracted)
Boulder Wham! (1965) (subcontracted)
Just Plane Beep (1965) (subcontracted)
Hairied and Hurried (1965) (subcontracted)
Highway Runnery (1965) (subcontracted)
Chaser on the Rocks (1965) (subcontracted)
Shot and Bothered (1966) (subcontracted)
Out and Out Rout (1966) (subcontracted)
The Solid Tin Coyote (1966) (subcontracted)
Clippety Clobbered (1966) (subcontracted)
Quacker Tracker (1967)
The Music Mice-Tro (1967)
The Spy Swatter (1967)

Film and television titles (as Format Productions unless otherwise noted)
Outlaws (1960–1962) (TV) (as Format Films)
I Spy (1965–1968) (TV)
The Glory Guys (1965)
Honey West (1965–1966) (TV)
Clambake (1967)
The Mothers-in-Law (1967–1969) (TV)
Hee Haw (1969) (TV)
Curiosity Shop (1971–1973) (TV)

Notes

 
American animation studios
Film and television title designers
Entertainment companies based in California
Mass media companies disestablished in 1962
Mass media companies established in 1959
Mass media companies established in 1965
Mass media companies disestablished in 1997
Re-established companies